David Rea (January 19, 1831 – June 13, 1901) was a U.S. Representative from Missouri.

Born near New Marion, Indiana, Rea attended the common schools.
He moved to Missouri with his parents, who settled in Andrew County in 1842.
He engaged in agricultural pursuits near Rosendale.
He taught school in the country 1849–1854.
He studied law, was admitted to the bar in 1862, and commenced practice in Savannah, Missouri, in 1863.
During the Civil War he enlisted in the Union Army and served successively as first lieutenant, captain, quartermaster, and lieutenant colonel.
He resumed the practice of his profession in Savannah.
He served as member of the board of education.

Rea was elected as a Democrat to the Forty-fourth and Forty-fifth Congresses (March 4, 1875 – March 3, 1879), but he failed reelection in 1878.
He practiced law in Savannah, Missouri, until his death in that city on June 13, 1901.
He was interred in the City Cemetery.

References

External links

 

1831 births
1901 deaths
Quartermasters
Union Army officers
Democratic Party members of the United States House of Representatives from Missouri
19th-century American politicians
People from Ripley County, Indiana
People from Savannah, Missouri